is a Ryukyuan gusuku in Nanjō, Okinawa. It is the second oldest castle in the Ryukyu Islands. The ruins consist of the old castle to the east being made out of rock and the other newer castle to the west being made out of ashlar masonry.

History
Before the Sanzan Period, the "King of the Ryukyu Islands" and the chief priestess would make a pilgrimage to Chinen Castle. The castle was the home of the Aji of Chinen Magiri. The new castle was built under Shō Shin who reigned from 1477 to 1526. In 1972 the ruins of Chinen Castle were designated as a National Historic Site.

References

External links
A video
Photo tour

Castles in Okinawa Prefecture